Kendé is a village and rural commune in the Cercle of Bandiagara of the Mopti Region of Mali. The commune contains five villages and at the time of the 2009 census had a population of 7,372.

The village of Kendé is situated on a plateau. Tommo So is spoken in the village. The local surname is Senguipiri [sèŋèpîl].

References

External links
.

Communes of Mopti Region